Carnal Crimes is a 1991 American erotic thriller film directed by Gregory Dark and produced by Andrew W. Garroni. This film's music was composed by Jeff Fishman and Matthew Ross. The film starring Martin Hewitt, Linda Carol, Rich Crater, Alex Kubik, Yvette Nelson and Paula Trickey in the lead roles.

Cast
 Martin Hewitt as Renny
 Linda Carol as Elise
 Rich Crater as Stanley
 Alex Kubik as Detective Ronas
 Yvette Nelson as Mia (as Yvette Stefens)
 Paula Trickey as Jasmine
 Charisse Cooper as Marcella
 Prince Hughes as Culbertson
 Doug Jones as Lang
 Andre Rosey Brown as Detective
 Sergio Salerno as Nathan
 Jasae as Christa
 Julie Strain as Ingrid
 Nicholas Celozzi as Marco
 Danny Trejo as Ticket Agent

References

External links
 
 

1990s erotic thriller films
1991 films
American erotic thriller films
1990s English-language films
1990s American films